From a Buick 8 is a horror novel by American writer Stephen King. Published on September 24, 2002, this is the second novel by King to feature a supernatural car (the first one being Christine which, like this novel, is set in Western Pennsylvania). According to the book's cover sleeve's inside front flap: "From a Buick 8 is a novel about our fascination with deadly things, about our insistence on answers when there are none, about terror and courage in the face of the unknowable." The title comes from Bob Dylan's song "From a Buick 6".

Plot
The novel is a series of recollections by the members of Troop D, a Pennsylvania State Police barracks in Western Pennsylvania. After Curtis Wilcox, a well-liked member of Troop D, is killed by a drunk driver, his son Ned begins to visit the barracks. The cops, the dispatcher and the custodian quickly take a liking to him. The troopers begin telling Ned about the "Buick 8".

The Buick 8, which resembles a vintage blue 1953 Buick Roadmaster, has been in storage in a shed near the barracks since 1979, when it was left at a gas station by a mysterious driver who then disappeared without a trace. The car, they discover, is not a car at all. It appears to be a Buick Roadmaster, but the steering wheel is immobile, the dashboard instruments are useless props, the engine has no moving parts, the ignition wires go nowhere, there are four portholes on the passenger side and only three on the driver side, the car heals itself when damaged and it repels all dirt or debris.

Sandy Dearborn, now Sergeant Commanding of Troop D, is the main narrator of the book, and tells the story to Ned, discussing various things that have happened with the car and his father's fascination with it. The car will frequently give off what they dub "lightquakes", or large flashes of purple light over an extended period of time. These lights will occasionally "give birth" to strange plants and creatures that are not like anything in our world. Two people have disappeared in the vicinity of the car — Curtis Wilcox's former partner Ennis Rafferty, as well as an escaped lowlife named Brian Lippy. It is later suggested that perhaps the Buick was actually a portal between our world and another.

After hearing the story of the Buick and how it has been kept secret by Troop D for so long, Ned becomes convinced that the car was somehow related to the death of his father in a seemingly random road accident. After all, the gas station attendant who first reported the Buick sitting in front of the station was the same man who, years later, would kill his father. Sandy cautions him to keep from obsessing over the Buick ("There are Buicks everywhere", he later warns), but after leaving Ned at the Troop D facility to eat at a diner, he realizes that Ned never asked whether anyone considered destroying it. He deduces that Ned is determined to destroy the Buick, and that the Buick wants to use that impulse to take Ned into the other world.

Sandy returns to the shed to find Ned sitting in it, Ned having poured gasoline under the car while holding a pistol and a match. Just as Sandy pulls Ned out, the Buick transforms into a portal, trying to draw both Ned and Sandy inside of it. The rest of the staff arrive on the feeling that something bad may happen, all of them helping recall the story of the Buick's origin at the station, and manage to pull Ned and Sandy free, but not before Sandy glimpses into the world on the other side of the Buick. He sees Lippy's swastika necklace and cowboy boots, along with Ennis's Stetson hat and Ruger revolver.

One last story is told, revealing that destroying the Buick actually was discussed. However, they come to theorize that the Buick functions as a sort of regulator valve between the worlds, and that destroying it would do more harm than good. They decide that it is safest to watch over the Buick, in the hope that whatever supernatural force it possesses will eventually dissipate and expire.

Eddie Jacubois, one of the troopers, ends up killing himself and Ned becomes a State Trooper. One day, Ned shows Sandy the Buick; there is now a crack in the windshield that has not healed.

Adaptation
Chesapeake Films announced in 2005 that George A. Romero would direct a motion picture adaptation of From a Buick 8. The script was written by Johnathon Schaech and Richard Chizmar. 
In 2007 Tobe Hooper replaced Romero, but production stalled in 2009 due to problems obtaining financing. 
A different adaptation is in development with William Brent Bell as director and writer.
In December 2019, Thomas Jane announced that together with producer Courtney Lauren Penn (Altitude) he will be teaming up to form LA-based content company Renegade Entertainment for the adaptation of this movie. On an August 2020 episode of The Kingcast podcast, Thomas Jane said that Jim Mickle has signed on to direct.

References

External links
From a Buick 8 at StephenKing.com

2002 American novels
Novels by Stephen King
Novels set in Pennsylvania
Fictional cars
Fictional characters with electric or magnetic abilities
Phantom vehicles